The 2008 Patriot League men's basketball tournament, a part of the 2007-08 NCAA Division I men's basketball season, took place March 5, 2008, as a single-elimination tournament, with games being played at the higher seeds' home courts. The American University Eagles won the league's regular season, and received the number one seed in the tournament. They kept their home advantage throughout the tournament and defeated Colgate, 52–46, on March 14, 2008, to win the conference tournament and received the Patriot League's automatic bid for the 2008 NCAA tournament.

Before the tournament
Prior to the season defending champion Holy Cross, was predicted to finish first in the league once again, while Bucknell, a team who had won a game in both the 2005 and 2006 NCAA Tournaments, was predicted to finish second. However the league was unpredictable, as both teams ended their conference regular seasons with a losing record. Lafayette started off strong in league play, but quickly fell by the wayside. American and Navy, teams predicted to finish fifth and seventh respectively, ended their seasons in first and second in the league, with American gaining home court advantage throughout the tournament.

Standings

Bracket
The Patriot League announced the bracket and seed on March 3, 2008.

* represents an overtime period

References

Tournament
Patriot League men's basketball tournament
Patriot League men's basketball tournament